Vong may refer to:

People
 Vong Kan, Cambodian politician
 Vong Phaophanit (born 1961), British artist
 Vong Pisen, Cambodian general
 Vong Sarendy (1929–1975), Fleet Admiral in the Khmer Republic
 Vong Savang (1931–1978), Crown Prince to the throne of the Kingdom of Laos
 Vong Lu Veng (born 1950), Hong Kong table tennis player
 Kan En Vong (born 1899), Chinese kindergarten educator
 Sisavang Vong (1885–1959), king of the Kingdom of Luang Phrabang and Kingdom of Laos
 Tep Vong (born 1932), Cambodian Buddhist monk

Other uses
 VONG, a shortwave relay of CBN (AM) in Newfoundland, Canada
 Vọng cổ, a Vietnamese song and musical structure
 Yuuzhan Vong, a fictional alien species from the Star Wars universe
 Several restaurants owned by French-American chef Jean-Georges Vongerichten

See also
 
 Wong (surname), a related name